Cape Harald Moltke is a headland in Peary Land, North Greenland. Administratively it is part of the Northeast Greenland National Park.

History
The cape was named by Lauge Koch after Danish painter, author and explorer Harald Moltke. The Danish scientific research station Kap Harald Moltke was built in 1972 near the cape under the auspices of Eigil Knuth. There is also a small airfield near the facility. The Kap Harald Moltke Arctic station, as well as nearby Brønlundhus Station —built in 1948— have been under the administration of the Peary Land Foundation since Eigil Knuth's death.

Geography
Cape Harald Moltke is located on the northern side of Independence Fjord, at the southwestern end of Melville Land. Jørgen Brønlund Fjord lies to the west of this headland, with its mouth between Cape Harald Moltke on the eastern side and Cape Knud Rasmussen to the west.

Bibliography

Eigil Knuth. Kap Harald Moltke, 1973

References

External links
 Field report from the journey to Northeast Greenland in the summer 2001

Headlands of Greenland